The Shibanids or Shaybanids or more accurately the Abu'l-Khayrid-Shibanids were a Persianized  Turko-Mongol dynasty in Central Asia who ruled over most of modern-day Kazakhstan, much of Uzbekistan, and parts of southern Russia (including Siberia) in the 15th century. They were the patrilineal descendants of Shiban, the fifth son of Jochi and grandson of Genghis Khan. Until the mid-14th century, they acknowledged the authority of the descendants of Shiban's brothers Batu Khan and Orda Khan, such as Öz Beg Khan. The Shaybanids originally led the grey horde southeast of the Urals (also known as the Uzbegs, after the Uzbeks), and converted to Islam in 1282. At its height, the khanate included parts of modern-day Afghanistan and other parts of Central Asia.

As the lineages of Batu and Orda died out in the course of the great civil wars of the 14th century, the Shaybanids under Abu'l-Khayr Khan declared themselves the only legitimate successors to Jochi and put forward claims to the whole of his enormous ulus, which included parts of Siberia and Kazakhstan. Their rivals were the Tukay-Timurid dynasty, who claimed descent from Jochi's thirteenth son by a concubine. Several decades of strife left the Tukay-Timurids in control of the Great Horde and its successor states in Europe, namely the Khanates of Kazan, Astrakhan, and Crimea.

Shaybanid dynasty

Under Abu'l-Khayr Khan (who led the Shaybanids from 1428 to 1468), the dynasty began consolidating disparate Ozbeg (Uzbek) tribes, first in the area around Tyumen and the Tura River and then down into the Syr Darya region. His grandson Muhammad Shaybani (ruled 1500–10), who gave his name to the Shaybanid dynasty, conquered Samarkand, Herat, Balkh and Bukhara, thus ending the Timurid dynasty and establishing the short-lived Shaybanid Empire. After his death at the hands of Shah Ismail I, he was followed successively by an uncle, a cousin, and a brother, whose Shaybanid descendants would rule the Khanate of Bukhara from 1505 until 1598 and the Khanate of Khwarezm (Khiva) from 1511 until 1695.

Another state ruled by the Shaybanids was the Khanate of Sibir, seizing the throne in 1563. Its last khan, Kuchum, was deposed by the Russians in 1598. He escaped to Bukhara, but his sons and grandsons were taken by the Tsar to Moscow, where they eventually assumed the surname of Sibirsky.

Shaybanid Architecture 

As the Shaybanids set out to make Bukhara the cultural and architectural capital of their dynasty, countless building ventures transformed the city under their rule. Bukhara’s grand mosque, the Kalan Mosque, was built in 1121 C.E. However, under the Shaybanids in the early 16th century, it was entirely reconstructed with the addition of stone columns, arches, and 288 vaults. The mosque was part of a religious complex that also consisted of a five-domed palace and a mosque. In 1530, under the rule of Ubaydullah, the Mir Arab Madrasa was added to the complex, in honor of a Sheikh known as Mir Arab. Opposite the Kalan Mosque, the Mir Arab Madrasa stood tall with two-story classrooms surrounding a central courtyard. The interior of much of the complex was decorated with plaster-carved ceilings and extensive colorful tilework. However, much of the tilework and wall inscriptions have not survived. In the second part of the 16th century, a north-south major roadway and an east-west passage were built throughout the city of Bukhara. In the years between 1562 and 1587, the north-south artery of the city housed the Charsu market development, which included three covered markets: The Goldsmiths’ Dome, the Hatsellers’ Dome, and the Moneychangers’ Dome. These markets, called taks for their multiple domes, were all less than 500m away from each other. Moreover, all around these covered markets were caravanserais and large madrasas that accommodated hundreds of people and students. Together, this created a lively central environment that supported the trade of an abundance of goods. 

In the late 16th century, during his reign as khan, Abdullah bin Iskander built two major structures, the Mohair Khan Madrasa and the Abdullah II Madrasa, together called the Kosh Madrasa. The Modari Khan Madrasa, a tribute to Abdullah ll’s mother, was built first, in 1567. Then, between 1588 and 1590, Abdullah Khan ll built another madrasa, the Abdullah ll Madrasa in his own honour. The decoration of the Abdullah Khan Madrasa consists of a complex glazed tile pattern with geometric stars, shapes, and borders. The madrasa also features various inscriptions containing the name of the ruler. The inscriptions were written in Arabic script with extended vertical lines. The large madrasa was built to serve as a theological school.

Another of the most significant monuments built by Abdullah Khan (1157–98 C.E.) was the Sarrafan Baths’. The Sarrafan Baths’ consisted of a central octagonal bath with rooms on all sides. The different rooms were multi-purpose, allowing for a range of activities from simple relaxation to business meetings, conversation, and games. There are differences between the layout of the men’s and women’s bath quarters. Men had separate rooms for worship and the rooms were intricately decorated with tile work. The women’s bath was less decorated and lacked any separate stalls.

Khans of Shaybanid dynasty of Khanate of Bukhara

Blue Row Signifies progenitor chief.
Khans of significance highlighted in Bold.

Notes

References
 Bartold, Vasily (1964) The Shaybanids. Collected Works, vol. 2, part 2. Moscow, 1964.
 Grousset, René (1970) The Empire of the Steppe: a history of central Asia Rutgers University Press, New Brunswick, NJ, (translated by Naomi Walford from the French edition, published by Payot in 1970), pp. 478–490 et passim, 
 Bosworth, C.E. (1996) The new Islamic dynasties: a chronological and genealogical manual Columbia University Press, New York, pp. 288–9, 
 Soucek, Svatopluk (2000) A History of Inner Asia Cambridge University Press, Cambridge, pp. 149–157, 
 Erkinov A. “The Poetry of the Nomads and Shaybani Rulers of Transition to a Settled Society”. In: Central Asia on Display: Proceedings of the VII. Conference of the European Society for Central Asian Studies (27–30 September 2000). G.Rasuly-Paleczek, J. Katsching (eds). Vienna, 2005. P.145-150.

Mongol dynasties
Uzbeks
Khanate of Bukhara
Turkic dynasties